The 2007 All-Ireland Senior Camogie Championship Final was the 76th All-Ireland Final and the deciding match of the 2007 All-Ireland Senior Camogie Championship, an inter-county camogie tournament for the top teams in Ireland.

Wexford led 2-2 to 0-3 at half-time and kept that lead throughout, giving them their first title for thirty-two years.

References

All-Ireland Senior Camogie Championship Finals
All
All-Ireland Senior Camogie Championship Final
All-Ireland Senior Camogie Championship Final, 2007